Thomas Hanson may refer to:

*Thomas Hawkins Hanson (1750–1812), American military general
Thomas Grafton Hanson (1865–1945), United States Army officer
Tom Hanson (Australian footballer) (1891–1986), Australian rules footballer
Tom Hanson (American football) (1907–1985), American football halfback
Thomas S. Hanson (born 1939), American politician
Tom Hanson (photojournalist) (1967–2009), Canadian photojournalist
Tommy Hanson (1986-2015), Major League Baseball pitcher
Tom Hanson (English actor) (born 12 January 1993)
Tom Hanson (American actor), actor and director
Tom Hanson, character in 21 Jump Street

See also 
Thomas Hansen (disambiguation)